Inside Game is a 2019 American sports drama written by Andy Callahan and directed by Randall Batinkoff and starring Scott Wolf, Eric Mabius, Will Sasso, and Lindsey Morgan.

This film is based on the 2007 NBA betting scandal and centers on Tommy Martino (Wolf) and his two friends NBA referee Tim Donaghy (Mabius) and bookie Baba Battista (Sasso). It was released on November 1, 2019. Philadelphia, New York, New Jersey and Florida are the main settings and primary shooting locations were in the New Jersey environs.

Plot
The plot follows a betting scheme between the three childhood friends who were uniquely situated to their roles.

Cast
 Scott Wolf as Tommy Martino
 Eric Mabius as Tim Donaghy
 Will Sasso as Baba Battista
 Lindsey Morgan as Stephanie, Tommy's girlfriend

References

External links
 
 
 
 
 

2019 films
2010s sports drama films
American sports drama films
Films scored by Jeff Beal
Films set in Philadelphia
Films shot in New Jersey
2019 drama films
2010s English-language films
2010s American films
English-language sports drama films